Geoff Miles (born 7 August 1957) is an Australian former cricketer. He played nine first-class cricket matches for Victoria between 1982 and 1984.

See also
 List of Victoria first-class cricketers

References

External links
 

1957 births
Living people
Australian cricketers
Victoria cricketers
Cricketers from Melbourne